Leptophobia caesia, the bluish white, is a butterfly in the family Pieridae. The species was first described by Hippolyte Lucas in 1852. It is found from Mexico to Ecuador.

Adults have black markings on the upperside. The underside of the hindwings is yellow.

The larvae feed on Podandrogyne pulcherrima.

Subspecies
The following subspecies are recognised:
Leptophobia caesia caesia (Ecuador)
Leptophobia caesia tenuicornis Butler & H. Druce, 1872 (Costa Rica, Panama)
Leptophobia caesia phanokia Fruhstorfer, 1907 (Colombia)

References

Pierini
Butterflies described in 1852
Pieridae of South America